Keith & Kristyn Getty are a duo from Northern Ireland who have been called the “preeminent” hymn writers of this generation that have “changed the way evangelicals worship” by Christianity Today. They are internationally recognized for the hymn “In Christ Alone,” co-written with Stuart Townend and estimated to be sung by over 100 million people annually. The song has been voted in the United Kingdom as the third most popular hymn of all time and has been recorded by a diversity of artists including Alison Krauss, Owl City, Newsboys, MercyMe, Natalie Grant, Shane & Shane, and Lauren Daigle. Other popular hymns in the Getty Music catalog include “Rejoice”, “The Lord Almighty Reigns”, “His Mercy Is More”, “He Will Hold Me Fast”, “The Power of the Cross", "The Lord Is My Salvation", "By Faith", and "Speak O Lord". The Gettys are GRAMMY nominated and Dove Award winning artists who have recorded 26 albums together. The duo has performed for presidents and prime ministers and presented sold out concerts at Carnegie Hall, The John F. Kennedy Center for the Performing Arts, and other noted venues in the US and abroad as part of their recurring Irish Christmas and Hymns tours. Their concerts have aired on American Public Television and the BBC. 

After the release of their 2017 book Sing! How Worship Transforms Your Life, Family, and Church, the pair established the annual Sing! Conference & Festival attracting tens of thousands in Nashville and online each year. The couple oversees Getty Music, a creative collective including a multi-artist, multi-writer record label and publishing house, as well as an education program for developing hymn writers and worship leaders. In 2020, Keith and Kristyn organized and founded the Getty Music Foundation which provides resources to churches and families, especially resources pertaining to theology and congregational singing education. Keith has been honored as an Officer of the Order of the British Empire (OBE) by Her Majesty Queen Elizabeth II, marking the first time the award has been given to an individual in the world of contemporary church music. In addition to singing and songwriting, Kristyn is a voice actress, and can be heard on projects for Disney, an animated telling of the classic Pilgrim’s Progress, and an audio version of the entire English Standard Version Bible published by Crossway. Keith & Kristyn and their four daughters maintain residence in both Nashville and Northern Ireland.

Members

Keith Getty 

Julian Keith Getty  (born ) was born in Lisburn, Northern Ireland to Helen Getty (née Irwin) and John Getty. He is the eldest of four children.

Getty learned to play classical guitar at age 11; at 12 years old he began playing the flute. During school, Getty was influenced by classical music, Irish music, and church music of all kinds. He studied music at St Chad's College, at the Canford Summer School of Music, and the Tanglewood Music Center in Massachusetts.

"In Christ Alone" song 

In 2001, Getty and Stuart Townend wrote the song "In Christ Alone" with the purpose of creating a modern hymn that would explain the life of Christ. They released it on the Kingsway album New Irish Hymns, featuring vocalists Máire Brennan, Margaret Becker, and Joanne Hogg. The song gained popularity, and by 2005 it was named by a BBC Songs of Praise survey as the 9th best loved hymn of all time, and in their 2010 survey was named 2nd best hymn of all time. It hit number one on the United Kingdom CCLI charts by 2006, and in January 2009, it was still number one in the UK, number two in Australia, number seven in Canada, and number 15 in the United States. The British Hymn Society nominated "In Christ Alone" as one of the top 5 hymns of all time, and BBC One's "Songs of Praise" nominated "In Christ Alone" as one of the top 10 hymns in 2012.

Kristyn Getty 

Kristyn Elizabeth Rebekah Getty (née Lennox, born ) was born in Belfast, Northern Ireland. She is the daughter of Gilbert Lennox, an elder of the non-denominational Glenabbey Church Glengormley on the outskirts of Belfast, and she is the niece of the mathematician John Lennox.

Kristyn began singing as a teenager in her family's church in Northern Ireland. She studied English literature at Queen's University of Belfast (1998–2001).

She recorded an unabridged reading of the Bible in the English Standard Version, published by Crossway in 2021.

Personal life 
The couple met in 2002 after John Lennox introduced the two to each other. After dating for two years, the couple married on 16 June 2004 in Armagh. They have had four children: Eliza Joy in 2011, Charlotte Juliana in 2013, Grace Alexandra in 2015, and Tahlia Lennox in 2018.

Keith & Kristyn also sponsor a compassion child, and in 2009 they traveled to Ecuador and met their sponsored child.

Getty and his wife live between Portstewart, Northern Ireland and Nashville, Tennessee with their four daughters.

Career 
The duo has pioneered the modern hymn genre and has written a catalog of songs that teach Christian doctrine by crossing the genres of traditional and classical composition with contemporary and globally-accessible melodies. Many of their modern hymns are rooted in the traditions of old Celtic and English hymns.

In Christ Alone album 
The duo's debut release was In Christ Alone, released in 2006. This record was a collection of Getty's best known ten hymns remade with Kristyn as the vocalist.

After a total distribution of approximately 200,000 units, In Christ Alone was nominated for a Dove Award in 2007. "The Risen Christ", a choral collection based on the album, was also nominated for a Dove Award in 2009.

This project was the basis for introducing Getty's wider catalog to the United States. Appearances included working with Billy Graham Evangelical Association on two festivals with Franklin Graham, appearances at Royal Albert Hall, Pentagon, National Prayer Breakfast Media Dinner as well as two top ten inspirational Christian radio hits ("Higher Throne" and "Power of the Cross").

Awaken the Dawn album 
In 2008, Awaken the Dawn was the duo's second album. The album was nominated in the 41st GMA Dove Awards for "Praise and Worship Album of the Year". Awaken the Dawn introduced a more "worship band" approach as Getty and Kristyn began to tour and present their music to an American audience. The album also collaborated with Grammy Award winning producer Phil Naish, the string arrangements of Rob Mathes (music producer of Kennedy Center Honors and Sting) and Nashville rhythm musicians. As a result of a total distribution of approximately 110,000 units, Awaken the Dawn was nominated for a Dove Award in 2009.

Hymns for the Christian Life album 
In 2012, The Getty's released Hymns for the Christian Life, a collection of music that most strongly represented the Getty's move to Nashville, Tennessee. The album is deeply personal, both in terms of writing more hymns on how the gospel speaks to the issues of everyday life and moving away to a more acoustic musical style that blends the two cultures they live—Irish and American folk music.

The album was produced by Charlie Peacock (The Civil Wars, Switchfoot) and Ed Cash (Chris Tomlin, David Crowder Band). The album featured special guests including Alison Krauss, Ricky Skaggs and Máire Brennan.

In 2014, The Greengrass Sessions EP was released as a supplement containing additional songs used on the Hymns for the Christian Life tour. This was a limited edition EP that contained recordings of the live tour band.

The Gospel Coalition Live album 
In the spring of 2013, the National Conference of The Gospel Coalition was held in Orlando, Florida, and was attended by more than 5,000 people from more than 40 countries and 49 of the United States. Keith and Kristyn Getty led the music at this event with traditional and modern hymns, including several selections from the Getty's well-known catalog. This became a live album, as well as a printed songbook.

The album was produced by Ed Cash, and features 13 previously-released songs.

Joy—An Irish Christmas album 
The Gettys were invited to appear at The Cove and create Christmas music for an evening with George Beverly Shea and Cliff Barrows. Billy Graham was a speaker during the first evening of their performances. In 2011, Keith and Kristyn Getty released Joy: An Irish Christmas. The album was dedicated to their daughter, Eliza Joy, born that year.

This album developed into a touring Christmas show, which has matured each year, presenting opportunities for performances at many of Americas leading concert halls. "Irish Christmas" has an annual Carnegie Hall sell out show, and was presented at the John F. Kennedy Center for the Performing Arts. Its popularity has led to numerous broadcasts, including on American Public Television through Detroit PBS. Coinciding with the tour, American Public Television stations aired Joy-An Irish Christmas nationally during the holiday season including broadcasts in at least 55 major U.S. television markets and to some 45+ million households. The 60-minute TV special, presented by Detroit Public Television, was taped in 2014 in the historic Tennessee Theatre in Knoxville, Tennessee. The concert was also released as a live album.

Facing a Task Unfinished Album and Global Hymn Sing 
In 2016, Keith and Kristyn Getty began work on their new album Facing a Task Unfinished. The album's title track is the hymn "Facing a Task Unfinished", which Keith & Kristyn were invited to re-write by OMF International from the original by Frank Houghton in 1931. On 21 February 2016, the Gettys led a global hymn-sing of the song, in which an estimated 1.1 million people sang the hymn in 100 countries. The album was recorded at Ocean Way in Nashville, Tennessee. The album also features special guests Ladysmith Black Mambazo, Fernando Ortega, John Patitucci, and Chris Tomlin. The album was scheduled to release June 2016.

His Mercy is More album 
On 10 May 2019, Keith and Kristyn Getty announced via their Facebook page an album named after the Christian worship hymn His Mercy Is More. The album features Getty Music partners Matt Papa and Matt Boswell and was released in August 2019.

Evensong album 
On September 4th, 2020, Keith and Kristyn Getty released the album "Evensong (Hymns and Lullabies at the Close of Day)", which features lullabies written by the Gettys throughout their parenthood, as well as various other hymns. This album served as a milestone and dedication to the past decade of their life, particularly through parenthood, and also as a celebration of Kristyn's fortieth birthday. This album is a product of collaboration between the Gettys and various other artists such as Vince Gill, Heather Headley, Ellie Holcomb, and Skye Peterson, daughter of musician and author Andrew Peterson.

Artistry and influence 
The Gettys have been influenced by the work of musicians such as Irish traditional musicians, George Gershwin and Johann Sebastian Bach. Their hymns have developed a particular poetic and musical style that unites people of diverse traditions and generations, choosing influences of folk and classical music as well as of contemporary songwriting and standard hymnody.

In reference to his song writing and musical performance, Keith Getty wrote in 2015: "I do not pretend to be qualified to write a theological treatise on this particular subject. Congregational singing is a holy act, and as I organize my thoughts, I hear my old pastor, Alistair Begg, reminding me that in our song worship, we have to be spiritually alive..."

When touring, Getty sometimes leads discussions on worship with local pastors, worship leaders, and other church musicians.

Tours 
The duo has performed at venues including the Ryman Auditorium, Carnegie Hall, Royal Albert Hall, the Pentagon, the Grand Ole Opry, and more. The Gettys have also performed for former United States President George W. Bush, South Korean President Lee Myung-bak, and Vice President Mike Pence.

Joy—An Irish Christmas 
In 2010, Tom Bledsoe invited Keith and Kristyn Getty to join a special Christmas celebration in with George Beverly Shea and Cliff Barrows. The event included Billy Graham as the headlining speaker. The Gettys prepared thirty minutes of music from their album Joy: An Irish Christmas for the first evening. Their segment was expanded to a fuller evening of music subsequently presented to a number of churches that year.

By 2011, Joy—An Irish Christmas was developed into a full-length album and a monthlong concert tour. Their first tour included 18 performances with several sold-out shows, including a concert at Schermerhorn Symphony Center in Nashville, Tennessee.

The tour returned in December 2012, with more than 30,000 people and over 18 performances. The Gettys performed at several concert hall venues including Atlanta's Cobb Energy Performing Arts Center, which sold out.

Irish Christmas took a hiatus in 2013 as Keith and Kristyn awaited the birth of their second daughter. The tour returned to North America in 2014. There were an estimated 50,000 people who attended the 18 performances. The tour featured stops at notable venues including Winspear Opera House in Dallas, Texas and Connor Palace Theater in Cleveland, Ohio. The 2014 tour culminated in a Carnegie Hall sell out with Ricky Skaggs as a special guest.

2015's Joy—An Irish Christmas Tour took place in over 20 cities across the southeastern United States, including sold-out concerts at Carnegie Hall, the John F. Kennedy Center, The Schermerhorn Symphony Center, and The Kimmel Center. The Gettys were joined by guest artists John Patitucci and Sally Lloyd-Jones in New York, as well as Buddy Greene and Ricky Skaggs at The Fox Theatre and the Schermerhorn Symphony Center, with astronaut Butch Wilmore as a special guest at the tour's final stop in Nashville.

Hymns for the Christian Life American & Celtic Tours 
The duo along with others toured the UK in 2012 during their The Northern Celtic Islands Tour. Over the course of three weeks, they appeared in ten concert halls, including the Liverpool Philharmonic Hall, Waterfront Hall, and Glasgow SECC Arena. Several of the performances were sold out weeks prior to the concert. Guest performers included Stuart Townend, New Scottish Choir and Orchestra, Jonathan Rea, New Irish Arts, and Dr. Noël Tredinnick.

In 2013, Keith and Kristyn embarked on the Hymns for the Christian Life Tour throughout North America. More than 40,000 people on a 22-city trek attended the tour. The Gettys performed at the Meyerson Symphony Center in Dallas, TX and Hamilton Place Theatre in Hamilton, Ontario. They also made appearances at several churches including  David Jeremiah's Shadow Mountain Community Church in San Diego, California, and  Charles Stanley's First Baptist Church in Atlanta, Georgia. Twelve cities on the tour were first-time appearances including the Getty's sold-out premiere performance in New York City.

Television appearances 
The Getty's Joy—An Irish Christmas music special was featured on Public Television across America November and December 2015, as well as on BBC One Northern Ireland in December 2015.

The Gettys were featured as a cover story on CBS Sunday Morning for their Easter 2015 (5 April) broadcast. CBS released this statement, "For the segment, which is titled In The Spirit, the Gettys were interviewed in their Nashville home by CBS News correspondent Tracy Smith and recorded while performing at the Grand Ole Opry in Nashville on St. Patrick's Day." CBS News reporter Tracy Smith focused on the backstory behind the popular hymn "In Christ Alone", which was originally written back in 2001 by Getty and Stuart Townend. In addition, Keith and Kristyn have made frequent appearances on BBC's Songs of Praise special.

In 2019 & 2020, TBN aired the program Sing! An Irish Christmas on their network for the Christmas season. The program featured the Gettys as well as Matt Boswell, Matt Papa, and others.

Awards and honours 
The song, "In Christ Alone" was number one on the CCLI UK charts by the year 2006, and was the number two song on the BBC charts in 2010. In Australia, it was the number two song in 2009. The British Hymn Society named "In Christ Alone" as one of the top 5 Hymns of All Time.

The album, "Awaken the Dawn" was nominated for a Dove award in 2008. "Hymns for the Christian Life" was also nominated for a Dove award in 2013.

In 2022, they earned their first Grammy nomination for their album Confessio – Irish American Roots in the Best Roots Gospel Album category.

Discography

As Keith Getty & Kristyn Lennox 

 Tapestry (2002)
 New Irish Hymns 2: Father, Son, and Holy Spirit (2003) with Margaret Becker, Joanne Hogg

As Keith & Kristyn Getty 
 New Irish Hymns 3: Incarnation (2004) with Margaret Becker, and Joanne Hogg
 New Irish Hymns 4: Hymns for the Life of the Church (2005) with Margaret Becker
 Songs That Jesus Said (2005), a collection of songs for children (Review in Reformed Worship | Audio lecture featuring Kristyn Getty, 6 October 2005)
 The Apostles' Creed (2006)
 Modern Hymns Live (2006)
 In Christ Alone  (2007)
 Prom Praise (2008) featured guest with the All Souls Orchestra; recorded live at Royal Albert Hall
 Keswick Live (2008) with Kristyn Getty, Stuart Townend, and Steve James, recorded at the 2008 Keswick Convention.
 Awaken the Dawn   (2009)
 Joy - An Irish Christmas (2011)
 Hymns for the Christian Life   (2012)
 Modern and Traditional Hymns: Live at the Gospel Coalition (2013)
 Facing a Task Unfinished (2016)
 The North Coast Sessions (2018)
 His Mercy Is More - The Hymns of Matt Boswell and Matt Papa (2019)
 Evensong: A Collection of Hymns and Lullabies at Close of Day (2020)
 Sing! Global (Live at the Getty Music Worship Conference) (2021)
 Confessio – Irish American Roots (2021)
 Sing! Live in Singapore   (2022)

References

External links

Musical duos from Northern Ireland
Protestants from Northern Ireland
British Christian musical groups